Gavril Olteanu (1888–1946) was a leader of a Romanian paramilitary militia group, part of the Maniu Guards during World War II, which became notorious for the killing and deportation of ethnic Hungarians in Transylvania.

Olteanu was born in Târgu Mureș (Marosvásárhely), Austria-Hungary in 1888.  After Northern Transylvania was ceded by Romania to Hungary in 1940, at a result of the Second Vienna Award, he moved to Brașov, where he took command of a paramilitary unit of the Iron Guard. During World War II, this unit was active in Trei Scaune, Ciuc, Odorhei, and Mureș counties.

Following King Michael's Coup of 23 August 1944, Romania switched allegiance from the Axis powers to the Allies. 
In early September, Soviet and Romanian forces entered Transylvania, captured the towns of Brașov and Sibiu, and engaged units of the Hungarian 2nd Army and the German 8th Army at the Battle of Turda. On 26 September 1944, in reprisals against attacks on Romanian troops by the local population, members of the paramilitary Maniu Guard led by Olteanu massacred a number Hungarian civilians in Aita Seacă village; 9 were shot, 2 decapitated, and 2 later died of their wounds. Other such incidents occurred in Sândominic, Huedin, Aghireș, and other localities around Transylvania.

At the request of Soviet representatives Deputy Foreign Minister Andrey Vyshinsky and Vladislav Petrovich Vinogradov on behalf of the Allied Control Commission, Romanian authorities disbanded the Maniu Guard, arrested Olteanu, and sentenced him to imprisonment. He died at Aiud Prison in late 1946; some sources claim he was murdered, while others claim that he committed suicide by ingesting strychnine.

Notes

External links
 Atrocities against Hungarians p30-32
 Genocide in Transylvania: nation on the death row
 Chronicle of Cruelties pp80-85
 Romania and Transylvania in the 20th Century, Ildikó Lipcsey p54

1946 deaths
Romanian military personnel of World War II
Inmates of Aiud prison
Romanian prisoners and detainees
Members of the Iron Guard
People from Târgu Mureș
1888 births
Romanian people who died in prison custody
Prisoners who died in Romanian detention
Holocaust perpetrators in Romania